The Sentinel is a collection of science fiction short stories by English writer Arthur C. Clarke, originally published in 1983.

The stories, written between 1946 and 1981, originally appeared in a number of magazines including Astounding, Famous Fantastic Mysteries, Thrilling Wonder Stories, 10 Story Fantasy, If, The Magazine of Fantasy & Science Fiction, Boys' Life, Playboy and Omni.

Contents
Contents of The Sentinel include:

Introduction: Of Sand and Stars
"The Sentinel"
"Holiday on the Moon"
"Earthlight"
"Rescue Party"
"Guardian Angel"
"Breaking Strain"
"Jupiter V"
"Refugee"
"The Wind from the Sun"
"A Meeting with Medusa"
"The Songs of Distant Earth"
The Contributors

References

External links 
 

1983 short story collections
Short story collections by Arthur C. Clarke
Berkley Books books